Ardeutica patillae is a species of moth of the family Tortricidae. It is found in Puerto Rico.

The wingspan is about 18 mm. The ground colour of the forewings is brownish with some fine white dots and two larger white spots at the costa near the middle. The markings are dark brown. The hindwings are brownish.

References

Moths described in 2011
Polyorthini
Moths of the Caribbean